Richard Blair Thomson (born 26 June 1957) is a Scottish former professional footballer played as a forward for Preston North End.

Early life
Thomson was born in Edinburgh, Scotland, on 26 June 1957.

Career
Preston North End was Thomson's only club. He joined the Lilywhites as an apprentice, and went on to make 71 Football League appearances for the club, scoring eleven goals.

On 4 August 1979, Preston and arch-rivals Blackpool met at Deepdale in the Anglo-Scottish Cup. With the hosts leading 3–1 in the final minute, Blackpool goalkeeper Tom McAlister saved Thomson's penalty, tipping the ball onto the bar. It bounced down over the line, but by then the referee, Ashley, had blown his whistle to signal the end of the game. The goal did not count, but the spectators went home in the belief that the scoreline was 3–2. The official explained to Thomson and McAlister that the moment the ball had stopped travelling forwards the game was over and ruled it had ended the moment McAlister touched the ball.

References

1957 births
Living people
Footballers from Edinburgh
Scottish footballers
Association football forwards
English Football League players
Preston North End F.C. players